Slovenia competed at the 2016 Winter Youth Olympics in Lillehammer, Norway from 12 to 21 February 2016.

Medalists

Alpine skiing

Boys

Girls

Parallel mixed team

Biathlon

Boys

Girls

Mixed

Cross-country skiing

Boys

Girls

Freestyle skiing

Halfpipe

Ski cross

Slopestyle

Nordic combined 

Individual

Nordic mixed team

Ski jumping 

Individual

Team

Snowboarding

Halfpipe

Snowboard cross

Slopestyle

See also
Slovenia at the 2016 Summer Olympics

References

2016 in Slovenian sport
Nations at the 2016 Winter Youth Olympics
Slovenia at the Youth Olympics